Agostino Cornacchini (August 27, 1686 – 1754) was an Italian sculptor and painter of the Rococo period, active mainly in Rome.

He was born in Pescia and died in Rome.  In 1712, Cornacchini established himself in the household of his uncle, Cardinal Carlo Agostino Fabbroni, who until 1720 provided Cornacchini with a studio, lodgings and an income. His masterpiece is the equestrian statue of Charlemagne at the base of the Scala Regia on the entrance to the Vatican Palace, which sits opposite Bernini's equestrian Constantine. His works can also be found in Orvieto Cathedral and in the Basilica of Superga in Turin.

See also
Equestrian statue of Charlemagne (Cornacchini)

Sources
St Peter's Basilica statue

1686 births
1754 deaths
People from Pescia
18th-century Italian sculptors
Italian male sculptors
Italian Baroque sculptors
17th-century Italian painters
Italian male painters
18th-century Italian painters
Rococo sculptors
18th-century Italian male artists